Siminoc River may refer to:
 Siminoc, a tributary of the Danube–Black Sea Canal in Constanța County, Romania
 Siminoc, a tributary of the Teșna in Bistrița-Năsăud County, Romania